Egoli Air is an airline based in Johannesburg, South Africa. It operates charter flights both domestically and to destinations throughout Africa. Its main base is OR Tambo International Airport, Johannesburg.

History 
The airline was established in 1986 and started operations in June 1986 as Million Air Aviation; it was rebranded as Million Air Charter in 1994 and took the current name in 2004.

Fleet 
The Egoli Air fleet consists of the following aircraft (at March 2007):
2 Antonov An-32
2 Antonov An-32B

References

Airlines of South Africa
Airlines established in 1996
Companies based in Johannesburg